Sultanayevo (Soltanay) is a rural locality (a selo) in Starogumerovsky Selsoviet, Kushnarenkovsky District, Bashkortostan, Russia. The population was 463 as of 2010. There are 13 streets.

Geography 
Sultanayevo is located 41 km south of Kushnarenkovo (the district's administrative centre) by road. Shemyak is the nearest rural locality.

References 

Rural localities in Kushnarenkovsky District